Fellows of the Royal Society elected in 1801.

Fellows

 Edmund Antrobus 
 Edward Ash (c.1764–1829)
 Edward Balme (d. 1823)
 William Bligh (1754–1817)
 Richard Chenevix (c.1774–1830)
 Martin Davy (1763–1839)
 John Ellis
 Edward Forster (1769–1828)
 James Willoughby Gordon (1773–1851)
 John Hailstone (1759–1847)
 Warren Hastings (1732–1818)
 George Isted (d. 1821)
 John Latham (1761–1843)
 William Long (1747–1818)
 Herbert Marsh, Bishop of Peterborough (1757–1839)
 Robert Nixon (1759–1837)
 Roger Elliot Roberts (c.1753–1831)
 Matthew Smith
 Walter Stirling (1758–1832)
 Samuel Turner (1759–1802)
 John Lloyd Williams
 Giffin Wilson (1766–1848)
 Robert Wissett (d. 1820)
 Charles Philip Yorke (1764–1834)

References

1801 in science
1801
1801 in the United Kingdom